Scaposerixia is a genus of longhorn beetles of the subfamily Lamiinae, containing the following species:

 Scaposerixia bicolor (Pic, 1926)
 Scaposerixia pubicollis (Pic, 1932)

References

Desmiphorini